Ukon may refer to different subjects:

 International Airport "Mykolaiv"  — an airport in Mykolaiv, Ukraine
 Nunchaku — may refer to the "right" section of the nunchaku
 Takayama Ukon — a Christian daimyō during the Sengoku period of Feudal Japan
 Ukon (poet) — one of the Japanese Thirty-six Female Poetry Immortals
 Ukon (Naruto) — a character featured in the famous anime Naruto
Turmeric — Japanese Turmeric used as a dietary supplement and spice